Mogheul is a town and commune in Lahmar District, Béchar Province, in western Algeria near the border with Morocco. According to the 2008 census its population is 635, down from 682 in 1998, with an annual growth rate of -0.7%, the lowest in the province.

Geography

Climate

Mogheul has a hot desert climate (Köppen climate classification BWh), with very hot summers and cool winters. Precipitation is generally light, although due to Mogheul's high altitude and latitude it does receive somewhat more rain than other locations in Béchar Province. Summers are particularly dry.

Economy

Agriculture is a significant industry in Mogheul. There are a total of 22,200 date palms planted in the commune. As of 2009 there were 745 sheep, 555 goats, and 2 cattle.

Infrastructure and housing

100% of Mogheul's population is connected to drinking water, 100% is connected to the sewerage system, and 89% (including 179 buildings) have access to electricity. There are no fuel service stations in the town; the nearest is in Béchar.

Mogheul has a total of 257 houses, of which 114 are occupied, giving an occupation rate of 5.6 inhabitants per occupied building, the second lowest in the province (after Lahmar).

Transportation

A local road connects the town to Lahmar,  to the south, and then continues south to the provincial capital Béchar,  from Mogheul.

Education

There is one elementary school, with 6 classrooms including 4 in use. There are a total of 44 school students; secondary students study in Lahmar.

6.1% of the population has a tertiary education, and another 23.7% has competed secondary education. The overall literacy rate is 84.9%, and is 89.9% among males and 80.0% among females.

Health

Mogheul has a polyclinic, and a room care facility. The nearest hospital is in Béchar.

Religion

Mogheul has one operational mosque, with another one under construction.

Localities
The commune is composed of two localities:

Mogheul
El Menabha

References

Neighbouring towns and cities

Communes of Béchar Province